Pfander, Pfänder or Pfaender is a surname.

People with the surname 

 Alexander Pfänder (1870–1941), German philosopher
 Carl Heinrich Pfänder (1819–1876), German portrait painter and revolutionary
 James Pfander, American lawyer
 Karl Gottlieb Pfander (1803–1865), Swiss missionary
William Pfaender (1826–1905), German-American politician and businessman

See also 

 Pfänder

Surnames
Surnames of German origin
German-language surnames